Louis Alexander Mountbatten, 1st Marquess of Milford Haven  (24 May 185411 September 1921), formerly Prince Louis Alexander of Battenberg, was a British naval officer and German prince related by marriage to the British royal family.

Although born in Austria, and brought up in Italy and Germany, Louis enrolled in the United Kingdom's Royal Navy at the age of fourteen. Queen Victoria and her son the Prince of Wales (later King Edward VII) occasionally intervened in his career: the Queen thought that there was "a belief that the Admiralty are afraid of promoting Officers who are Princes on account of the radical attacks of low papers and scurrilous ones". However, Louis welcomed assignments that provided opportunities for him to acquire the skills of war and to demonstrate to his superiors that he was serious about his naval career. Posts on royal yachts and tours arranged by Queen Victoria and Prince Edward actually impeded his progress, as his promotions were perceived as undeserved royal favours.

After a naval career lasting more than forty years, in 1912 Louis was appointed First Sea Lord, the professional head of the British naval service. With the First World War looming, he took steps to ready the British fleet for combat, but his background as a German prince forced his retirement once the war began, when anti-German sentiment was running high. He changed his name and relinquished his German titles, at the behest of King George V, in 1917. The King made Louis Marquess of Milford Haven. 

Louis married Princess Victoria of Hesse and by Rhine, a granddaughter of Queen Victoria. The couple had four children, including Queen Louise of Sweden and Louis Mountbatten, 1st Earl Mountbatten of Burma, who also served as First Sea Lord from 1954 to 1959. The Marquess and Marchioness of Milford Haven were the maternal grandparents of Prince Philip, Duke of Edinburgh.

Early life

Louis Alexander of Battenberg was born in Graz, Styria, on 24 May 1854, the eldest son of Prince Alexander of Hesse and by Rhine by his morganatic marriage to Countess Julia von Hauke. Because of his morganatic parentage, Louis did not inherit his father's rank in the Grand Duchy of Hesse; and, from birth, his style of Illustrious Highness and title of Count of Battenberg instead derived from the rank given to his mother at the time of her marriage. On 26 December 1858, he automatically became His Serene Highness Prince Louis of Battenberg when his mother was elevated to Princess of Battenberg with the style of Serene Highness, by decree of her husband's brother, Louis III, Grand Duke of Hesse.

Shortly after Louis's birth, his father was stationed with the Austro-Hungarian Army of occupation in Northern Italy during the Second Italian War of Independence. Louis's early years were spent either in the north of Italy or at Prince Alexander's two houses in Hesse, the castle of Heiligenberg in Jugenheim, and the Alexander Palace in Darmstadt. Because his mother spoke French to him and he had an English governess, he grew up trilingual.

Among the visitors entertained at Heiligenberg were Battenberg's relations, the Russian imperial family and his cousin, Prince Louis of Hesse. Influenced by his cousin's wife, Princess Alice, a daughter of Queen Victoria, and by Prince Alfred, another of Queen Victoria's children, Battenberg became a naturalised British subject and joined the Royal Navy on 3 October 1868 at age fourteen. He was admitted by the Board of Admiralty without the production of a medical certificate, which was contrary to the usual regulation. He had been found medically unfit "on account of small, flat chest, slight lateral curvature of the spine and defective vision", but was allowed to join so as not to disappoint the Queen. He was entered as a naval cadet aboard , Nelson's old flagship, then used as a permanently moored receiving ship.

In January of the following year, the Prince and Princess of Wales cruised the Mediterranean and Black Seas in the frigate ; and the Prince of Wales requested that Louis be appointed to the vessel, before his training was complete. As part of the same tour, Louis accompanied them on a visit to Egypt, where they visited the construction site of the Suez Canal. As was traditional, the Khedive, Isma'il Pasha, bestowed honours on the party, with Louis receiving the Medjidie (4th Class); in April, he received the Osmanie (4th Class) from the Ottoman Sultan.

Early naval career

Louis returned to Britain in May 1869. In June he joined , the flagship of the North America and West Indies Station, becoming a midshipman in October. From June to September 1870 he took leave in Germany, coinciding with the Franco-Prussian war, but he spent the next three-and-a-half years in the Americas (Bermuda and Halifax, Nova Scotia), where his tour of duty served to make up for the training he had missed while posted with the Prince of Wales on the Ariadne.

In 1875, again at the invitation of the Prince of Wales, he joined , which conducted the Prince on an official tour of India, 1875–76. Louis sketched some of the events of the tour and his drawings were published in the Illustrated London News. He was promoted to lieutenant on 15 May 1876. The Prince asked Louis to stay with him at Marlborough House for the summer of 1876, but wishing to gain further experience at sea, Louis instead accepted an offer to join Prince Alfred, Duke of Edinburgh, as a lieutenant on board . In addition to acting as the Duke's equerry, Louis continued his naval duties. He did not enjoy the position, as the Duke was rather touchy and Louis's cabin was infested with rats, one of which he caught with his bare hands as it ran across his chest as he lay in bed. The Sultan toured the Mediterranean from July 1876.

In late February–early March 1878, Louis was still serving on the Sultan as it lay in the Bosphorus during the Russo-Turkish War. He was criticised for visiting his brother, Prince Alexander, who was serving with the Russian forces, but an investigation cleared both Louis and Alexander, as well as Prince Alfred, of any wrongdoing. On 17 February 1880 he, his father, and Tsar Alexander II witnessed an explosion at the Winter Palace in Saint Petersburg, when Stephen Chalturin unsuccessfully attempted to assassinate the Tsar with dynamite beneath the great dining room.

The ship sailed to South America, South Africa, Australia, Fiji, Japan, China, Hong Kong, Singapore and the Dutch East Indies, before returning to South Africa in April 1882. Seven months after Louis left Britain on the voyage, actress Lillie Langtry allegedly bore him an illegitimate daughter, Jeanne Marie. Langtry was also a one-time mistress of the Prince of Wales. Jeanne Marie's parentage was never completely verified, but Louis made a financial settlement nonetheless.

From South Africa the Inconstant sailed to St Helena, and the Cape Verde Islands, where the squadron received orders to proceed to Gibraltar, and from there to Malta and Egypt to take part in the Anglo-Egyptian War. On 11 July 1882, Alexandria was bombarded and in the next two weeks Louis served in the Flying Squadron delivering shells and ammunition to the battle fleet, and then as a guard to the Khedive at Ras Al Teen Palace. He was decorated with the Egypt War Medal by Queen Victoria personally.

In November 1882, he left the Inconstant, spent Christmas in Darmstadt, and in March the following year visited his younger brother, Prince Alexander, in Bulgaria. Alexander had been made Sovereign Prince of Bulgaria in 1879 with the approval of Europe's Great Powers. Louis accompanied his brother on a state visit to Turkey, and then on a tour of Cyprus and the Holy Land with the Turkish navy, during which Louis was appalled at the lack of seamanship—the Turkish captains were unable to navigate and had to hug the coast so as not to get lost; when they did leave the coast they became so disoriented that they were unable to steer for Jaffa. On its return journey the ship on which they had travelled ran aground.

Marriage and family

In September 1883, Queen Victoria appointed him to her yacht, . On 30 April 1884 at Darmstadt in the presence of the Queen, Prince Louis married her granddaughter, Princess Victoria of Hesse and by Rhine. His wife was the eldest daughter of Queen Victoria's second daughter Princess Alice and Louis IV, Grand Duke of Hesse. Through the Hesse family, Prince and Princess Louis of Battenberg were first cousins once removed. They had known each other since childhood, and invariably spoke English to each other. As wedding presents Louis received the British Order of the Bath and the Star and Chain of the Hessian Order of Louis.

Louis and Victoria had four children:

In 1885, one of Louis's younger brothers, Prince Henry of Battenberg, married Princess Beatrice, the youngest child of Queen Victoria, and took up residence with the Queen in Britain so that Beatrice could continue to serve as her mother's companion and personal secretary.

Commander

On his penultimate day aboard the Queen's yacht, 30 August 1885, Louis was promoted to the rank of commander. Irish nationalist Member of Parliament (MP) Willie Redmond and Liberal MP Charles Conybeare both questioned Battenberg's appointment to Dreadnought in the British House of Commons. Conybeare asked, "What special qualifications have entitled a foreigner to be promoted over the heads of some 30 British officers?" First Lord of the Admiralty Lord George Hamilton said, "Captain Stephenson, who commands the Dreadnought, applied for Prince Louis of Battenberg to fill the appointment. I may add that another officer who is about to command a large iron-clad in the Mediterranean has made a similar application." He added that 22 commanders junior to Battenberg held similar appointments, and that Battenberg was a naturalised British subject. Another Liberal MP, Edward Pickersgill, backed up by Conybeare and Irish nationalist Charles Tanner, questioned the propriety of Battenberg's appointment to the Navy in 1868, given Battenberg's failure to get the required medical certificate, and suggested that he only got in the Navy because of royal favour.

On 3 October 1889, Battenberg was appointed to his first independent command, a torpedo-cruiser, which saw service in the Red Sea.

Captain
On 31 December 1891, Prince Louis was promoted to the rank of captain. At the beginning of the following year, he was appointed naval advisor to the inspector-general of fortifications. His role was to act as a liaison between the navy and the army in order to ensure a co-ordinated defence. Traditionally, there was a great deal of friction between the two services, but Louis exercised his social skills in the role, leading Prince George, Duke of Cambridge, to write to him, "You have produced a mutual feeling of goodwill and unanimity which I have always wished to see established, and which, by your tact and sound judgement, you have brought about to the fullest extent."

In 1892, Battenberg invented the Battenberg Course Indicator, a relative velocity analogue computer device used by seamen to determine course and speed to steer for changes of position between ships.

By February 1894 his role was further developed when he was appointed joint secretary of the naval and military committee on defence, which was later renamed the Committee of Imperial Defence. His careful study of both naval and military defence, as well as its interaction, led to his appointment as assistant director of the Naval Intelligence in June 1899. He used his relationships with the royal houses of Europe to gather intelligence on the naval fleets of other nations, which he passed on to the Admiralty in full and detailed reports. He became an aide-de-camp to the Queen in 1897, a post he would retain under both King  and King .

He commissioned the newly built battleship  on 10 September 1901, and served as its captain for a year in the Mediterranean, during which he spectacularly defeated a larger opposing force in a naval exercise. When the Second-in-Command of the Mediterranean Fleet, Rear-Admiral Burges Watson, died suddenly in late September 1902, Louis was temporarily appointed 2nd class Commodore with added responsibilities. In November of the same year he was appointed as Director of Naval Intelligence, an apt posting for a man whom First Lord of the Admiralty the Earl of Selborne described as "the cleverest sailor I have met yet".

Admiral
He was promoted to rear admiral on 1 July 1904, in which year his family connections to the royal courts of Europe helped resolve the Dogger Bank incident peacefully. During a successful two years the squadron visited Greece, Portugal, Canada, and the United States, where the American press commented favourably on Prince Louis's courtesy, unassuming manner and democratic nature.

After less than six months in post his flag was transferred to the battleship  in August 1907. The following year, he was promoted to vice-admiral, and appointed as Commander-in-Chief, Atlantic Fleet. Historian Andrew Lambert described Battenberg as a sea-going admiral as "more cerebral than the average, although somewhat lazy. The [fleet] exercises had a greater sense of realism, reflecting the latest thinking on weapons and strategy." In 1909, he published a translation of Commander Vladimir Semenoff's Rasplata (The Reckoning), a memoir of the Russo-Japanese War of 1904–05, and witnessed the first crossing of the English Channel by air by Louis Blériot. He was appointed as commander of the newly constituted Third and Fourth Divisions of the Home Fleet two years later. The years immediately preceding this appointment were marred by disagreements between Admirals Sir John Fisher and Lord Charles Beresford over the direction of the navy and the imposition of reforms. Louis largely supported Fisher's modernising efforts, although he disapproved of his methods, and as a result Fisher's opponents attempted to prevent Louis's promotions.

Sea Lord
Fisher recommended Louis as First Sea Lord in 1911: "He is the most capable administrator in the Admirals List by a long way", but elements of the British press were against his appointment on the grounds that he was a German. Horatio Bottomley said it was "a crime against our Empire to trust our secrets of National Defence to any alien-born official". In December 1911, Louis did return to the Admiralty but as Second rather than First Sea Lord. As Second Sea Lord, Louis pushed through improvements in working conditions for the ratings, and created an Admiralty War Staff that would prepare the navy's plans in case of war. He was promoted to full admiral on 13 July 1912.

However, almost a year to the day later, on 8 December 1912, Battenberg assumed the post of First Sea Lord in succession to Admiral Sir Francis Bridgeman. Military historian Hew Strachan contends that Battenberg "lacked Fisher's dogmatism. Not the least of his attractions to Churchill [the First Lord] was his malleability. The combination of frequent change and weak appointees [Wilson, Bridgeman and Battenberg] ensured that the professional leadership of the Royal Navy lost its direction in the four years preceding the war. Power now lay with the service's civilian head ... Winston Churchill".

As First Sea Lord, Battenberg was responsible to the First Lord for the readiness of the fleet and the preparation of naval strategy, as well as the development of a scheme for state insurance of merchant vessels in times of war, which was to prove essential in preventing prohibitive insurance rates that would have stifled British trade.

On the eve of the World War, Churchill and Battenberg made the crucial decision to cancel the scheduled dispersal of the British fleet following practice manoeuvres, to preserve the Royal Navy's battle readiness. In the view of Andrew Lambert, "While Churchill planned to recall Fisher if war broke out, he missed the chance to prevent war that might have been provided by drafting him earlier. No Cabinet advised by Fisher would have made such a blundering, incompetent, disastrous response to the July [1914] Crisis. The British trumpet gave a very uncertain note in July [1914], allowing the Germans to delude themselves that Britain might be neutral ... the contrast in habits between the energy and enthusiasm of the young First Lord and the lackadaisical habits of the First Sea Lord Prince Louis of Battenberg made Fisher's recall all but inevitable."

Upon the outbreak of war, gout began to cause Battenberg considerable pain, and the naval staff he had set up did not function as well as it ought to have done. On 6 August 1914 Battenberg and the French Deputy Chief of Staff of the Navy Antoine Schwerer signed a convention in London on the division of responsibilities between the two navies. The convention confirmed the terms of the Entente Cordiale, and placed France in command of all naval operations in the Mediterranean. Malta and Gibraltar would both be treated as French naval bases. In the event that Austria entered the war France would act against its naval forces, and would at minimum prevent them passing the Strait of Otranto.

Anti-German sentiment rose among the British public, in newspapers, and in elite gentlemen's clubs, where resentment was inflamed by Admiral Lord Charles Beresford despite Churchill's remonstrances. Driven by public opinion, Churchill asked Prince Louis to resign as First Sea Lord on 27 October 1914. When acceptance of Battenberg's resignation was delayed by the King's opposition to the appointment of Fisher in his place, Louis wrote to Churchill, "I beg of you to release me. I am on the verge of breaking down & I cannot use my brain for anything". On 13 November he wrote to Churchill's Naval Secretary, Rear-Admiral Horace Hood, "It was an awful wrench, but I had no choice from the moment it was made clear to me that the Government did not feel themselves strong enough to support me by some public pronouncement."

His resignation was announced amid an outpouring of appreciation from politicians and naval comrades. Battenberg had written to Churchill on 28 October, "What I shd value above all else is to be admitted to the Privy Council." The King later swore Louis in as a Privy Councillor in a public show of support. Labour party politician and trade union leader J. H. Thomas wrote to The Times: "I desire to express my extreme regret at the announcement that Prince Louis of Battenberg has, by his resignation, pandered to the most mean and contemptible slander I have ever known ... I was simply astounded to hear the base suggestions and rumours current, and I am afraid that his action will simply be looked upon as a triumph for the mean and miserable section of people, who, at a time of national trial, is ever ready to pass a foul lie from lip to lip without a tittle of evidence." Admiral of the Fleet Lord John Hay thought that the "ingeniously propagated lies" originated from Germany.

Prince Louis held no official post for the remainder of the war and lived in retirement at Kent House on the Isle of Wight. He occupied his time in writing a comprehensive encyclopaedia on naval medals published in three large volumes, which became the standard reference work on the subject. His naval career had been characterised by industry, invention and intellect; he introduced mechanical calculators to compute navigations and a cone signalling apparatus. Although assured that he would be returned to command post-war, on 9 December 1918 the First Sea Lord, Admiral Sir Rosslyn Wemyss, wrote to Prince Louis informing him that he would not be employed again and suggested that he might retire in order to facilitate the promotion of younger officers. Prince Louis agreed, and he officially retired on 1 January 1919 "at [his] own request", shortly before reaching the mandatory retirement age of 65.

Adoption of the surname Mountbatten

During the war, persistent rumours that the British Royal Family must be pro-German, given their dynastic origins and many German relatives, prompted the King to abandon his subsidiary German dynastic titles and adopt an English surname. At the behest of the King, Louis relinquished the title Prince of Battenberg in the Grand Duchy of Hesse, along with the style of Serene Highness, on 14 July 1917. At the same time, Louis anglicised his family name, changing it from "Battenberg" to "Mountbatten", having considered but rejected "Battenhill" as an alternative. On 7 November, the King created him Marquess of Milford Haven, Earl of Medina, and Viscount Alderney in the peerage of the United Kingdom. He was offered a dukedom by George V, but declined as he could not afford the lavish lifestyle expected of a duke.

The King's British relatives in the Teck, Schleswig-Holstein, and Gleichen families underwent similar changes. Louis's wife ceased to use her own title of Princess of Hesse and became known as the Marchioness of Milford Haven. His three younger children ceased to use their princely titles and assumed courtesy titles as children of a British marquess; his eldest daughter, Princess Alice, had married into the Greek Royal Family in 1903, and never had occasion to use the surname Mountbatten. However, her only son, Prince Philip of Greece and Denmark, adopted the name when he became a British subject in 1947.

While the transition in names and titles was being effected, Louis spent some time at the home of his eldest son, George. After anglicising his surname to Mountbatten and becoming Marquess of Milford Haven, Louis wrote in his son's guestbook, "Arrived Prince Hyde, Departed Lord Jekyll".

Final years and death
During the war, two of Lord Milford Haven's sisters-in-law (Empress Alexandra Feodorovna and Grand Duchess Elizabeth Feodorovna) were killed by the Bolsheviks in Russia. Eventually, in January 1921, after a long and convoluted journey, the body of Grand Duchess Elizabeth Fyodorovna was interred in Jerusalem in the presence of Milford Haven and his wife.

In 1919, the Milford Havens had to give up their home, Kent House, for financial reasons. He sold his collection of naval medals. All of his financial investments in Russia were seized by the Bolsheviks and his German property became valueless with the collapse of the mark. He sold Heiligenberg Castle, which he had inherited from his father, in 1920.

Milford Haven was appointed Military Knight Grand Cross of the Order of the Bath (GCB), to add to the Civil one he already held, in recognition of his service to the Royal Navy in the 1921 New Year Honours, and was specially promoted by Order in Council to the rank of Admiral of the Fleet on the Retired List, dated 19 August. A few days later he joined , the ship on which his son Louis was serving, for a week at the invitation of the captain Dudley Pound. It was his last voyage; he died at 42 Half Moon Street, Piccadilly, London in the annexe of the Naval and Military Club on 11 September 1921 of heart failure following influenza. After a funeral service at Westminster Abbey, his remains were buried at St. Mildred's Church, Whippingham, on the Isle of Wight.

The marquess's elder son, George Mountbatten, who had received the courtesy title Earl of Medina, succeeded him as 2nd Marquess of Milford Haven. Louis's younger son, styled Lord Louis Mountbatten after 1917, served in the Royal Navy, became First Sea Lord like his father, was the last Viceroy of India, and was created Earl Mountbatten of Burma in 1947.

Titles, styles, honours and arms

Titles and styles 
 24 May 1854 – 26 December 1858: His Illustrious Highness Count Louis of Battenberg
 26 December 1858 – 14 July 1917: His Serene Highness Prince Louis of Battenberg
 14 July – 7 November 1917: The Right Honourable Sir Louis Mountbatten
 7 November 1917 – 11 September 1921: The Most Honourable The Marquess of Milford Haven

Honours
Orders and decorations

Appointments
 Honorary naval aide-de-camp to the Sovereign, 1 January 1897
 Privy Councillor, 5 November 1914

Arms

Ancestry

Notes and citations

References

 ADM 196/38 Battenberg Service Record at The National Archives (fee payable for download).

External links
 
 

1854 births
1921 deaths
Military personnel from Graz
German emigrants to England
Burials at St. Mildred's Church, Whippingham
Directors of Naval Intelligence
Louis of Battenberg, Prince
Louis of Battenberg, Prince
Members of the Privy Council of the United Kingdom
Lords of the Admiralty
German princes
Counts of Germany
Royal Navy admirals of the fleet
Royal Navy personnel of the Anglo-Egyptian War
Naturalised citizens of the United Kingdom
Milford Haven, Louis Mountbatten, 1st Marquess of
Peers created by George V

Knights Commander of the Order of St Michael and St George
Knights Grand Cross of the Order of the Bath
Knights Grand Cross of the Royal Victorian Order
Knights of Justice of the Order of St John
Grand Crosses of the Order of Franz Joseph
Grand Croix of the Légion d'honneur
Grand Crosses of the Order of Christ (Portugal)
Recipients of the Order of the White Eagle (Russia)
Recipients of the Order of St. Anna, 1st class
Recipients of the Order of Saint Stanislaus (Russian), 1st class
Recipients of the Order of the Medjidie, 4th class
Grand Crosses of Naval Merit
Recipients of the Order of the Rising Sun with Paulownia Flowers